Looking Ahead may refer to:

 Looking Ahead (Billy Joe Royal album), 1987
 Looking Ahead (Ricky Ford album), 1986
 Looking Ahead (Ken McIntyre album), 1960
 Looking Ahead, a 1948 novel by Vera Panova
 Looking Ahead!, a 1958 album by Cecil Taylor
Lookin' Ahead, a 1962 by The Jazz Crusaders

See also
 
 
 Lookahead (disambiguation)
 Ahead (disambiguation)